Lorwin is a surname. Notable people with the surname include:
Lewis L. Lorwin (1884–1970), Russian-American historian and planner
Rose Strunsky Lorwin (1884–1963), Russian-American translator and socialist
Val R. Lorwin ( 1907–1982), American civil servant, economist, and historian

See also
Lorin
Łowin (disambiguation)